Resident Evil is a 2002 action horror film written and directed by Paul W. S. Anderson. The film stars Milla Jovovich, Michelle Rodriguez, Eric Mabius, James Purefoy, Martin Crewes, and Colin Salmon. It is the first installment in the Resident Evil film series, which is loosely based on the video game series of the same name. Borrowing elements from the video games Resident Evil and Resident Evil 2, the film follows amnesiac heroine Alice and a band of Umbrella Corporation commandos as they attempt to contain the outbreak of the T-virus at a secret underground facility.

German studio Constantin Film bought the rights to adapt the series in January 1997. Several writers and filmmakers, such as Alan B. McElroy, George A. Romero and Jamie Blanks, were initially hired to direct and write the film, but their scripts were rejected. In 2000, Anderson was announced as writer and director. Developed as a prequel set in the same continuity as the video game series, the film was initially titled Resident Evil: Ground Zero, but was retitled after the September 11 attacks. Cast was announced in early 2001 and principal photography commenced in March 2001 in Berlin.

Resident Evil was theatrically released in Germany on March 12, 2002, by Constantin Film Verleih, and in the United Kingdom on July 12, 2002, by Screen Gems and Pathé Distribution. The film received generally mixed reviews from critics and grossed $103 million worldwide against a production budget of $33 million. It was followed by five sequels establishing their own alternate continuity: Apocalypse (2004), Extinction (2007), Afterlife (2010), Retribution (2012), and The Final Chapter (2016).

Plot
Underneath Raccoon City exists a genetic research facility called the Hive, owned by the Umbrella Corporation. A thief steals the genetically engineered T-virus and contaminates the Hive with it. In response, the facility's artificial intelligence, the Red Queen, seals the Hive and kills everyone inside. Alice awakens in the bathroom of a deserted mansion with amnesia. She dresses, checks the mansion, and is tackled by an unknown person as a group of commandos led by James Shade breaks in. Alice's attacker is cuffed and then released when he claims to be Matt Addison, who just transferred as a cop in Raccoon P.D. Alice and Matt are ordered to go down to the Hive with the group, where they find another amnesiac, Spence, hidden in their train. The commandos explain that everyone in the group except Matt is an employee of the Umbrella Corporation, and Alice and her partner Spence were assigned to guard the Hive's secret entrance under the mansion under the pretense of being married.

At the Red Queen's chamber, a laser defense system kills Shade and three more commandos. Despite the Red Queen's urgent pleas for the group to leave, Kaplan disables it, causing the power to fail and all of the doors in the Hive to open. This releases the zombified staff and containment units containing Lickers, creatures created through experimentation with the T-virus. The humans are attacked by the horde, and J.D. dies. Rain retreats with Kaplan and Spence, and Matt becomes separated from Alice, who starts regaining her memories. Matt looks for information about his sister, Lisa, and finds her zombified. Alice saves him, and Matt explains he and Lisa were environmental activists, and Lisa infiltrated Umbrella to smuggle out the evidence of illegal experiments. Alice remembers she was Lisa's contact in the Hive but does not tell Matt. The survivors reunite at the Red Queen's chamber, where the commandos explain they have one hour before the Hive traps them inside automatically. Alice and Kaplan activate the Red Queen to find an exit; to force her cooperation, they rig a remote shutdown.

As they escape through maintenance tunnels, zombies ambush them, and a reanimated J.D. bites Rain before she shoots him dead. They reach safety except Kaplan, who is bitten and separated from the group. Alice remembers that an anti-virus is in the lab, but they find it missing. Spence and Alice remember that Spence was the thief who stole and purposefully released the T-virus, and hid the T-virus and anti-virus on the train. Spence turns against the others but is bitten by a zombie, which he kills before trapping the survivors in the lab. Spence retrieves the anti-virus but is killed by a Licker set upon him by the Red Queen. The Red Queen offers to spare Alice and Matt if they kill Rain, who has been infected too long for the anti-virus to work reliably. As the Licker attempts to reach them, a power outage occurs. The lab door opens to reveal that Kaplan shut down the Red Queen to open the door. The group heads to the train, where Alice retrieves the anti-virus and kills a reanimated Spence before escaping with the others.

On the train, they inject Rain and Kaplan with the anti-virus. The Licker, having hidden on the train, attacks them, clawing Matt and killing Kaplan. Alice subdues the Licker before Matt is attacked by a zombified Rain, the anti-virus having failed to cure her. He shoots Rain dead, and her head hits a button, opening a door and dropping the Licker under the train, killing it. At the mansion, Matt's wound begins mutating. Before Alice can give him the anti-virus, the mansion doors burst open, and a group of Umbrella scientists seizes them. They subdue Alice and take Matt away, revealing he is to be put into the Nemesis Program, and that the Hive is to be re-opened for an investigation into the incident. Later, Alice awakens at the Raccoon City Hospital strapped to an examination table, and escapes outside to find Raccoon City deserted and in ruins. She retrieves a shotgun from an abandoned police car and continues through the streets.

Cast

Production

Development
German production company Constantin Film bought the film rights for Resident Evil in January 1997, and hired screenwriter Alan B. McElroy to write the script. At the time, McElroy was also writing the film adaptation for another survival horror video game, Doom, which ultimately wasn't used. The May 1998 issue of PlayStation Magazine published an article about McElroy's Resident Evil script. Described as action- and horror-packed and very violent, the script was similar to the original game. Some changes were made; for example, there was no mention of the Umbrella Corporation or STARS. Instead, the plot followed a special forces team sent by the government to rescue scientists from the mansion laboratory after the S.W.A.T team sent in earlier was killed, during which they realize the mission was a trap and that they are specimens in a medical experiment. The script included all major characters and monsters from the game. McElroy's script was rejected.

In 1998, George A. Romero directed a television commercial for the video game Resident Evil 2. The original game's director, Shinji Mikami, was a fan of Romero and had been influenced by his films. The commercial was only shown in Japan, but impressed Sony enough for them to ask him to write and direct Resident Evil. Romero stated that he had his secretary play the entire game through and record the gameplay so he could study it as a resource. Romero's screenplay was based on the first Resident Evil game and included characters from the video games. Chris Redfield and Jill Valentine were the lead characters, involved in a romantic relationship. Barry Burton, Rebecca Chambers, Ada Wong, and Albert Wesker were to also appear. The ending to the film would have been similar to the best ending to the first Resident Evil game. Romero also hired artist Bernie Wrightson to design some concept artwork of creatures for the film, and Wrightson did several designs of Tyrant, based on its look in the original game and its description in Romero's script. In a 2002 interview in Fangoria, Romero said that he wrote a total of five or six different drafts, but that they were rejected. Robert Kulzer, head of the production, said that, although he felt Romero's script was good, the film would have received an NC-17 rating if it had been approved. He also said that the producers thought that McElroy did well with his script, but that they rejected it because, by the time it was finished, the second game would have been released and they felt a film based on the first game would appear dated. Romero said a number of people from Capcom and Constantin supported his script, but Constantin head Bernd Eichinger ultimately rejected it. In 2019, the University of Pittsburgh's Library System acquired the "George A. Romero Archival Collection", which included material involving his work on Resident Evil. These include several more copies of Romero's Resident Evil script, and a first draft of McElroy's script, dated May 29, 1997, all of which are available to read at the University.

After Romero left the project, other writers and directors were involved in it for the next few years before the film finally went into production. In early 2000, director Jamie Blanks, who two years earlier directed successful psychological slasher film Urban Legend, was involved to direct the Resident Evil film based on another script from the new writer, which was about the STARS team fighting against monsters created by a virus outbreak inside Raccoon City. This version was cancelled as well.

In 1995, Paul W. S. Anderson's low budget film Mortal Kombat became one of the first commercially successful video game adaptations. After playing Resident Evil, Anderson saw its cinematic potential and wrote a script titled Undead, which he described as "a ripoff" of the game. Bernd Eichinger, head of Constantin Film, was enthusiastic, so Anderson developed it into the script for Resident Evil. In late 2000, Anderson was announced as director and writer, and Resident Evil re-entered pre-production stages.  Anderson stated the film would not include any tie-ins with the video game series as "under-performing movie tie-ins are too common and Resident Evil, of all games, deserved a good celluloid representation".

Casting
In early 2001, Michelle Rodriguez, James Purefoy and Milla Jovovich were the first of the cast to be signed on the project. David Boreanaz was intended to portray the male cop lead of Matt Addison; however, he turned down the role to continue work on the WB series Angel. Boreanaz suggested that he was in negotiations to have a smaller role in the film, claiming "Resident Evil is still there, a possibility, So, yeah, I'll see what happens", but he later declined the role. The role of Matt Addison then went to Eric Mabius who was cast in March 2001, along with Heike Makatsch, who was cast as Matt Addison's sister Lisa Addison, an employee working for Umbrella's Hive facility.

Filming and story development

In early March 2001, half of the film was to be shot in Adlershof Studios in Berlin and its surroundings. Principal photography began on March 5, 2001 at numerous locations including the then unfinished station U-Bahnhof Bundestag of the Berlin U-Bahn, Landsberger Allee, Kaserne Krampnitz and the Schloss Lindstedt.

The film was originally subtitled as Resident Evil: Ground Zero when the movie was considered a prequel to the games, but the subtitle was removed due to 9-11. The film's synopsis as of March 16, 2001 revealed that Jovovich's Alice and Rodriguez's Rain were the leaders of a commando team sent in to prevent a viral outbreak from spreading to the rest of the world. The character of the Red Queen was added into the film's story as an homage to Lewis Carroll's Alice in Wonderland.

During production, professional dancers were hired to star as zombies as they had better control of their body movements. While computer effects were used on some zombies, much of the undead appearances were accomplished through make-up while their movements were a more laissez-faire approach, as Anderson told the actors to move however they thought a zombie would, given their conditions. Whilst filming, there was a shortage of manpower where the available dancers were not enough to represent the required numbers of undead, but some of Capcom's executives and several of the film producers including Jeremy Bolt agreed to make appearances. The film's stunt coordinator also made an appearance as the dog trainer while Bolt's girlfriend and sister both appeared as zombies.

The film's score and soundtrack were composed by Marco Beltrami and Marilyn Manson during mid-2001. Manson described the score and soundtrack as being more "electronic" than his previous work.

Relationship to the games
Elements are borrowed from Resident Evil 2 and Resident Evil 3: Nemesis, including Alice's character awakening in Raccoon City Hospital with a viral outbreak occurring in the city. There are several references to characters and organizations such as the Umbrella Corporation, the Nemesis program, the underground train bearing the moniker "Alexi-5000" (a double callback to a similar train in Resident Evil 2 and Code: Veronicas villain Alexia Ashford), and a police cruiser, from which Alice takes out a shotgun, with a "STARS" logo on the hood. Jason Isaacs appears uncredited in the film as a masked unnamed doctor, a reference to William Birkin. The character of Dr. Isaacs (played by Iain Glen) in the film's sequels is named after him.

Other references include Alice examining the mansion outside, where crows are visible; crows are minor enemies throughout the games. Alice finds a picture of her wedding day with Spence, which is in the same style as the photos in the first version of the Resident Evil game: black-and-white with the foreground image noticeably spliced into the background. In the newspaper at the end of the film, the words "Horror in Raccoon City! More Victims Dead!" are shown in the upper right corner. This is a reference to the same newspaper in the censored opening of the first Resident Evil game and the prologue chapter for the Resident Evil: The Umbrella Conspiracy novel. Near the beginning of the film, Alice examines a statue after the wind blows its cover off. This statue is similar in design to one in the mansion of the first game.

While returning to the Red Queen's chamber, Kaplan points out that the four bodies of the group's dead crew from the Glass Hallway Trap sequence are gone. This is a reference to the games, where the bodies of enemies disappear. When the survivors make their escape from the Hive with a countdown as they fight the Licker, this is a reference to the Resident Evil game which ends with a five-minute countdown, during which the boss must be defeated.

Anderson has stated that the film's camera angles and several shots allude to the video game's camera angles, such as the fight between Alice and the security guard. These include a scene near the beginning where there is a close up of Alice's eye, a direct reference to the title screen of the first game. In another scene, Alice awakes and hears a creepy sound, which is a reference to the plot of the first game.

Release

Marketing
In March 2001, the official website was set up, which revealed the film's original October 26, 2001 release and a redirect to the film's production company Constantin Film. The website was fully opened in July 2001, and composed of images, plot info, character biographies and downloads. In January 2002, the film was officially announced to have an R rating, although Anderson decided not to make it as gory as the games. Originally it received an NC-17 rating and Anderson had to make cuts; the uncut version was teased but never released.

In December 2001, Sony gave fans a chance to design the film's poster with a prize of an undisclosed amount of cash and free screening of the film, with the final design being the film's poster. On February 16, 2002, Nick Des Barres, a 23-year-old aspiring actor and ex-video game magazine designer, was announced as the winner of the competition. The film's trailer and clips were released in late January and early February 2002. ‘’Resident Evil’’ was released on March 15, 2002 in the US.

On June 29, 2004, over two years after the film's release, a novelization by Keith R. A. DeCandido was published.

Distribution
In May 2001, it was announced that Sony Pictures Releasing would distribute the film in North America through their Screen Gems label. It was suggested by Capcom executives that the film would not be released in 2001, but rather in 2002, which was later confirmed by Sony in August 2001. The film was set for release on April 5, 2002 before being pushed forward to a March 15 release.

In December 2001, it was announced that Pathé and FilmFour had acquired the British theatrical distribution rights to the movie as part of a partnership between the two companies. They would both share acquisition and distribution costs and divide profits equally, while Pathé's UK distribution arm would handle distribution.

Home media 

Resident Evil was released on VHS and DVD by Columbia TriStar Home Entertainment on July 30, 2002 in the United States, April 14, 2003 by 20th Century Fox Home Entertainment in the United Kingdom and October 2002 by Buena Vista Home Entertainment in Australia. It was a special edition release, with a number of documentaries including five featurettes, one of which explained the making of Resident Evil, the film's score composition, costume design, set design, zombie make up tests, and the music video for a remixed version of "My Plague" by Slipknot.

A Deluxe Edition was released on September 7, 2004, which included new special features such as an alternate ending with director Anderson's video introduction, a clip compilation for Apocalypse, From Game to Screen featurette, a storyboarding Resident Evil featurette, and 6 other exclusive featurettes: The Creature, The Elevator, The Train, The Laser, Zombie Dogs and Zombies.

Screen Gems released Resident Evil: Resurrected Edition, a 2-disc package containing Resident Evil and Resident Evil: Apocalypse, on September 4, 2007.

On January 1, 2008, a Blu-ray of the Resident Evil trilogy was released. The film was also released on Ultra HD Blu-ray along with the five sequels on November 17, 2020.

Television 
In the United Kingdom, it was watched by  viewers on television during the first half of 2005, making it the eighth most-watched UK film on television during that period.

Reception

Box office
The film opened in 2,528 theaters and grossed $17,707,106 on its opening weekend (March 15–17, 2002), ranking in second place behind Ice Age. The film grossed $40,119,709 domestically and $103,787,401 worldwide.

Critical response

On Rotten Tomatoes the film has a score of 35% based on reviews from 131 critics and an average rating of 4.60/10. The consensus reads, "Like other video game adaptations, Resident Evil is loud, violent, formulaic, and cheesy." On Metacritic, the film has an average score of 33 out of 100 based on 24 critics, indicating "generally unfavorable reviews". Audiences polled by CinemaScore gave the film an average grade of "B" on an A+ to F scale.

Robert K. Elder from the Chicago Tribune thought the film "updates the zombie genre with an anti-corporate message while still scaring its audience and providing heart-pounding action". Owen Gleiberman from Entertainment Weekly noted: the film is as "impersonal in its relentlessness as the video-game series that inspired it".

Resident Evil and its sequel appeared on Roger Ebert's most hated films list, published in 2005. In his review, Ebert described it as a zombie movie set in the 21st century, where "large metallic objects make crashing noises just by being looked at", and criticized the dialogue for being a series of commands and explanations with no "small talk".

In 2014, filmmaker James Cameron named Resident Evil his biggest guilty pleasure.

Accolades

Sequels

After commercial success at the box office, a sequel, Resident Evil: Apocalypse (2004) was released. It was followed by Resident Evil: Extinction (2007), Resident Evil: Afterlife (2010), Resident Evil: Retribution (2012) and Resident Evil: The Final Chapter (2016). Anderson did not direct the second or third films due to filming commitments with Alien vs. Predator (2004) and Death Race (2008).

See also
 List of films based on video games

References

External links

 
 
 

Resident Evil (film series)
2002 films
2002 horror films
2000s action horror films
2002 science fiction action films
German action horror films
German science fiction action films
German science fiction horror films
British zombie films
2000s English-language films
English-language German films
Films directed by Paul W. S. Anderson
Apocalyptic films
Films produced by Paul W. S. Anderson
Films set in country houses
Films set in the United States
Films shot in Berlin
Films shot in Brandenburg
Films shot in Toronto
Girls with guns films
Films about viral outbreaks
Films about rebellions
Films scored by Marco Beltrami
Films produced by Bernd Eichinger
Screen Gems films
Film4 Productions films
Constantin Film films
Films with screenplays by Paul W. S. Anderson
British action horror films
British science fiction horror films
British science fiction action films
2000s science fiction horror films
2000s British films
2000s German films